A senolytic (from the words senescence and -lytic, "destroying") is among a class of small molecules under basic research to determine if they can selectively induce death of senescent cells and improve health in humans. A goal of this research is to discover or develop agents to delay, prevent, alleviate, or reverse age-related diseases. A related concept is "senostatic", which means to suppress senescence.

Research
Possible senolytic agents are under preliminary research, including some which are in early-stage human trials. The majority of candidate senolytic compounds are repurposed anti-cancer molecules, such as the chemotherapeutic drug dasatinib and the experimental small molecule navitoclax.

According to reviews, it is thought that senolytics can be administered intermittently while being as effective as continuous administration. This could be an advantage of senolytic drugs and decrease adverse effects, for instance circumventing potential off-target effects.

Senolytic candidates

Senomorphics 
Senolytics eliminate senescent cells whereas senomorphics – with candidates such as Apigenin, Rapamycin and rapalog Everolimus – modulate properties of senescent cells without eliminating them, suppressing phenotypes of senescence, including the SASP.

See also 
 Autophagy
 Biogerontology
 DNA repair#Senescence and apoptosis
 Geroprotector
 Hsp90
 Immunosenescence
 Invariant NKT (iNKT) cells
 Klotho (biology)#Effects on aging
 Life extension
 Senescence-associated beta-galactosidase, used as a biomarker
 Senotherapy
 Sirtuin-activating compound
 Unity Biotechnology
 Venetoclax
 YPEL3#Cellular senescence

References

External links 
 
 , a review that is open access and features a list of senolytics candidates
 
 
Senescence in non-human organisms
Senescence
Anti-aging substances